Per-Olav Olsson was a Swedish sprint canoer who competed in the early 1950s. He won two medals at the 1950 ICF Canoe Sprint World Championships in Copenhagen with a silver in the K-4 10000 m and a bronze in the K-2 10000 m events.

References

Year of birth missing
Year of death missing
Swedish male canoeists
ICF Canoe Sprint World Championships medalists in kayak